Antonio Mastrandrea (born May 26, 1961) is an Italian sprint canoer who competed in the early 1980s. At the 1980 Summer Olympics in Moscow, he finished ninth in the K-2 1000 m event and was eliminated in the semifinals of K-2 500 m event.

References
Sports-Reference.com profile

1961 births
Canoeists at the 1980 Summer Olympics
Italian male canoeists
Living people
Olympic canoeists of Italy
20th-century Italian people